Roland is a tragédie lyrique in three acts by the composer Niccolò Piccinni. The opera was a new setting of a libretto written by Philippe Quinault for Jean-Baptiste Lully in 1685, specially adapted for Piccinni by Jean-François Marmontel and based on Ludovico Ariosto's epic poem Orlando Furioso (The Frenzy of Orlando). The opera was first performed on 27 January 1778 by the Académie Royale de Musique (Paris Opera) at the Théâtre du Palais-Royal.

Background and performance history
Roland was the first opera Piccinni wrote for Paris. He had been hired by the Académie royale de musique in 1776, in spite of his ignorance of the French language. Piccinni still knew no French when he was composing Roland and had to be helped all the way by his librettist Marmontel, who provided a translation of every word along with details on how to accentuate it correctly. Marmontel also helped Piccinni come to terms with the French style of opera, which was very different from the Italian. The French preferred short arias, accompanied recitative and plenty of dance movements. In spite of these obstacles, Roland was a great success at its premiere.

Roland forms part of a late 18th-century vogue for resetting libretti Quinault had written for Lully, the first major French opera composer, almost one hundred years before. Another famous example is Gluck's Armide (1776). In fact, Gluck – who was regarded as Piccinni's rival in Paris – was said to have abandoned work on his own setting of Roland when he learnt of Piccinni's version. Piccinni went on to set another Quinault libretto, Atys, in 1779.

Roles

Synopsis
Marmontel's revised libretto adheres closely to Quinault's original. The major changes are the omission of the allegorical prologue and the reduction of Quinault's five acts to three. For an outline of the plot see Roland (Lully).

Recordings
Roland Soloists, Bratislava Chamber Choir, Orchestra Internazionale d'Italia conducted by David Golub (Dynamic, 2001)
Médor's demanding Italianate aria, "En butte aux fureurs de l'orage", has been recorded by Rockwell Blake on the CD, Airs d'Opéras Français, Orchestre philarmonique de Monte-Carlo, conducted by Patrick Fournillier (EMI, 1994)

References
Notes

Sources
 Pitou, Spire (1983–1990). The Paris Opéra: An Encyclopedia of Operas, Ballets, Composers, and Performers (3 volumes). Westport, Connecticut: Greenwood Press. .
 Rushton, Julian (2001). "Niccolò Piccinni", pp. 673–676, in The New Penguin Opera Guide, edited by Amanda Holden. New York: Penguin Putnam. .
 Warrack, John; West, Ewan (1992). The Oxford Dictionary of Opera. New York: Oxford University Press. .

External links
 
 Libretto in French (Paris: Duchene, 1781) at Google Books.

Operas
French-language operas
Operas by Niccolò Piccinni
1778 operas
Tragédies en musique
Operas based on works by Ludovico Ariosto